Heikkilä is a surname originating in Finland. The name is derived from Heikki, the Finnish equivalent of the Scandinavian name Henrik and the Germanic Henry, plus the suffix -lä, a patronymic indicating a child of a household headed by a man named Heikki. Among Finnish immigrants to North America, the name was sometimes Anglicized as Heikkila.

Geographical distribution
As of 2014, 95.2% of all known bearers of the surname Heikkilä were residents of Finland and 3.6% of Sweden.

In Finland, the frequency of the surname was higher than national average (1:378) in the following regions:
 1. Lapland (1:208)
 2. North Ostrobothnia (1:215)
 3. Tavastia Proper (1:239)
 4. Kymenlaakso (1:243)
 5. Pirkanmaa (1:265)
 6. Central Ostrobothnia (1:266)
 7. Southwest Finland (1:271)
 8. South Ostrobothnia (1:278)
 9. Satakunta (1:279)

Notable people
Jukka M. Heikkilä (born 1966), author
Jussi Heikkilä (born 1983), hurdler
Kari Heikkilä (born 1960), ice hockey skater
Lasse Heikkilä (born 1934), ice hockey skater
Marja Heikkilä (born 1977), freestyle swimmer
Samu Heikkilä (born 1971), film editor
Tapio Heikkilä (born 1990), football player

References

Finnish-language surnames
Patronymic surnames